This is a list of the 77 Italian DOCG (Denominazione di Origine Controllata e Garantita) wines ordered by region. The four original DOCGs were Brunello, Vino Nobile, and Barolo (all approved by a presidential decree in July 1980) and Barbaresco (as approved in October 1980).

Northern regions

Emilia Romagna
Albana di Romagna (Bianco as secco or asciutto, amabile, dolce, passito and passito riserva), produced in the provinces of Bologna, Forlì-Cesena and Ravenna
Colli Bolognesi Pignoletto, produced in the province of Bologna

Friuli-Venezia Giulia
Ramandolo (Bianco), produced in the province of Udine, in the area of Ramandolo, in the commune of Nimis, Italy and in part of the comune of Tarcento
Colli Orientali del Friuli Picolit (Passito), produced in the province of Udine
Rosazzo, produced in the province of Udine

Lombardia
Franciacorta (as Spumante, Spumante rosé and Spumante cremant), produced in the province of Brescia
Oltrepo Pavese Metodo Classico (as Rosé, Cremant, Pinot Noir, Pinot Noir Rosé), produced in the province of Pavia
Moscato di Scanzo or "Scanzo", produced in the province of Bergamo
Sforzato di Valtellina or Sfurzat di Valtellina (Rosso), produced in the province of Sondrio
Valtellina Superiore (Rosso as normale and Riserva) with the option to indicate one of the sub-regions Inferno, Grumello, Maroggia, Sassella and Valgella, produced in the province of Sondrio, or the sub-region Stagaflassi for wine bottled in Switzerland

Piemonte
Asti in the sub-appellations Asti (Bianco) and Moscato d'Asti (Bianco), produced in the provinces of Asti, Cuneo and Alessandria
Barbaresco (Rosso as normale and Riserva), produced in the province of Cuneo
Barbera d'Asti (Rosso as normale and Superiore), produced in the province of Asti, with the option to indicate one of the sub-regions 
Tinella in the region surrounding Costigliole d'Asti
Colli Astiani in the region surrounding Vigliano d'Asti
Nizza, produced in the region surrounding Nizza Monferrato. Formerly a sub-region of Barbera d'Asti, it was promoted to DOCG in 2014 
Barbera del Monferrato Superiore (Rosso), produced in the provinces of Asti and Alessandria
Barolo (Rosso as normale, Riserva and Chinato), produced in the province of Cuneo
Brachetto d'Acqui or Acqui (Rosso as normale and Spumante), produced in the provinces of Asti and Alessandria
 Dolcetto di Dogliani Superiore or Dogliani (Rosso), produced in the province of Cuneo
 Dolcetto di Ovada Superiore or Ovada (Rosso), produced in the province of Alessandria
Gattinara (Rosso as normale and Riserva), produced in the province of Vercelli
Gavi or Cortese di Gavi (Bianco as Frizzante, Spumante and Tranquillo), produced in the province of Alessandria
Ghemme (Rosso as normale and Riserva), produced in the province of Novara
Roero (Bianco as Roero Arneis and Roero Arneis Spumante, Rosso as normale and Riserva), produced in the province of Cuneo
 Erbaluce di Caluso or Caluso (Bianco), produced in the province of Turin
 Dolcetto di Diano d'Alba or Diano d'Alba (Rosso), produced in the province of Cuneo
 Ruché di Castagnole Monferrato (Rosso), produced in the province of Asti
 Alta Langa  (Sparkling, traditional method), produced in the provinces of Alessandria, Asti and Cuneo

Veneto
Amarone della Valpolicella
Bagnoli Friularo or "Friularo di Bagnoli"
Bardolino Superiore (Rosso), produced in the province of Verona
Colli di Conegliano, produced in the province of Treviso
Colli Euganei Fior d'Arancio or "Fior d'Arancio Colli Euganei", produced in the Padua
Asolo Prosecco or sometimes "Colli Asolani Prosecco" before 2014, produced in the province of Treviso
Conegliano Valdobbiadene Prosecco, produced in the province of Treviso
Lison, produced in the province of Treviso and straddling the border with Friuli
Montello Rosso, produced in the province of Treviso 
Piave Malanotte or "Malanotte del Piave", produced in the Piave area
Recioto di Soave (Bianco as normale, Classico and Spumante), produced in the province of Verona
Soave Superiore (Bianco as normale, Classico and Riserva), produced in the province of Verona
Recioto di Gambellara (Bianco)
Recioto della Valpolicella

Central regions

Abruzzo
Colline Teramane Montepulciano d'Abruzzo, produced in a subregion of Montepulciano d'Abruzzo in the Teramo province
 Tullum, also known as Terre Tollesi, located near the middle of Abruzzo's coastline.

Lazio
Cannellino di Frascati, a sweet dessert wine, produced in the province of Roma
Cesanese del Piglio or "Piglio", grown in the Prenestina hills southeast of Rome. Red, some sparkling is produced.
Frascati Superiore, produced in the province of Roma

Marche
Castelli di Jesi Verdicchio Riserva, produced in the province of Ancona
Conero (Rosso only as Riserva), produced in the province of Ancona
Offida, produced in the province of Ascoli Piceno
Vernaccia di Serrapetrona (Rosso as Dolce and Secco), produced in the province of Macerata
Verdicchio di Matelica Riserva, produced in the province of Matelica

Toscana
Brunello di Montalcino (Rosso as normale and Riserva), produced in the province of Siena
Carmignano (Rosso as normale and Riserva), produced in the provinces of Firenze and Prato
Chianti (Rosso as normale and Riserva), in the provinces of Arezzo, Firenze, Pisa, Pistoia, Prato and Siena; with the option to indicate one of the sub-regions:
Colli Aretini as normale and Riserva produced in the province of Arezzo
Colli Senesi as normale and Riserva, produced in the province of Siena
Colli Fiorentini as normale and Riserva, produced in the province of Firenze
Colline Pisane as normale and Riserva, produced in the province of Pisa
Montalbano as normale and Riserva, produced in the provinces of Firenze, Pistoia and Prato
Montespertoli as normale and Riserva, produced in the province of Firenze
Rufina as normale and Riserva, produced in the province of Firenze
Chianti Superiore, produced throughout the Chianti region with the exception of the classico sub-region.
Chianti Classico became a separate DOCG in 1996. Chianti Classico was originally established as a sub-region of the Chianti DOC in 1967, which became a DOCG in 1984. Chianti Classico DOCG has different regulations from Chianti DOCG, the percentage of Sangiovese used in Chianti Classico DOCG is at least 80% compared to 70% to 75% that of Chianti DOCG. White varietal is prohibited in Chianti Classico DOCG while it can be used in Chianti DOCG.
Elba Aleatico Passito produced in the Livorno
Montecucco produced in the province of Grosseto
Morellino di Scansano (Rosso as normale and Riserva), produced in the province of Grosseto
Suvereto produced in the province of Livorno
Val di Cornia produced in the province of Livorno and Pisa
Vernaccia di San Gimignano (Bianco as normale and Riserva), produced in the province of Siena
Vino Nobile di Montepulciano (Rosso as normal and Riserva), produced in the province of Siena

Umbria
Sagrantino di Montefalco (Rosso as Secco and Passito), produced in the province of Perugia
Torgiano Rosso Riserva (Rosso only as Riserva), produced in the province of Perugia

Southern regions

Basilicata
Aglianico del Vulture Superiore, produced in the province of Potenza

Campania
Aglianico del Taburno, produced in the province of Benevento
Fiano di Avellino (bianco), produced in the province of Avellino using the Fiano grape.
Greco di Tufo (bianco, also as spumante), produced in the province of Avellino
Taurasi (rosso also as Riserva), produced in the province of Avellino

Puglia
Castel del Monte Bombino Nero, produced in the provinces of Bari and Foggia 
Castel del Monte Nero di Troia Reserva, produced in the provinces of Bari and Foggia 
Castel del Monte Rosso Riserva, produced in the provinces of Bari and Foggia
Primitivo di Manduria Dolce Naturale, produced in the province of  Taranto

Sardinia
Vermentino di Gallura (Bianco as normale and Superiore), produced in the provinces of Nuoro and Sassari

Sicilia
Cerasuolo di Vittoria (Rosso as normale and Classico), produced in the provinces of Caltanissetta, Catania and Ragusa

See also

 Denominazione di origine controllata
 List of Italian DOC wines
 Italian wine

References

External links
Official Gazette of the Italian Republic, n.169, 2008 (PDF)

Wines Docg
Italy
Wine-related lists